Hipu is an associated commune located in the island commune of Taha'a, in French Polynesia. It is situated in the subdivision of the Leeward Islands, an overseas collectivity of French Polynesia.

Structure 
The associated commune of Hipu is made up of part of the island of Taha'a, and the two motus closest to this region:

References

Populated places in the Society Islands